Makrygialos ( or 'Long Beach') is a coastal village and a former municipal district in Pieria regional unit, Greece. It lies 21 km away from the town of Katerini Since the 2011 local government reform it has been part of the municipality Pydna-Kolindros, of which it is a municipal community. The 2011 census recorded 1,706 people in Makrygialos. The village is a tourist resort and many of the inhabitants are Pontians.

Visiting Makrigialos The main church in the centre of the village is that of St. George. There are also three chapels, St. Paraskevi, St. John and St. Dimitrios. In the second half of June the Makrigialos Mussel Festival takes place and residents and visitors can drink wine and sample the locally farmed mussels. The local football team, Lightning Makrigialos, was founded in 1940

References

Populated places in Pieria (regional unit)